Brayton Knapp (born November 11, 1986) is an American professional soccer player.

Career

Rochester Rhinos
Knapp made his professional debut for the Rochester Rhinos on May 28, 2013 during the third-round of the US Open Cup when his club took on the New England Revolution.

Career statistics

References

External links 
 Portland Pilots bio
 Rochester Lancers Profile.

1986 births
Living people
American soccer players
Portland Pilots men's soccer players
Colorado Rapids U-23 players
Seattle Sounders FC U-23 players
Washington Crossfire players
Rochester Lancers (1967–1980) players
Rochester New York FC players
Association football defenders
Soccer players from Washington (state)
USL League Two players
Major Indoor Soccer League (2008–2014) players
Seattle Sounders FC non-playing staff
Sportspeople from Redmond, Washington